Sonny Boy is a 1929 film released by Warner Bros., directed by Archie Mayo, and starring Davey Lee, Edward Everett Horton, and Betty Bronson. Some of the movie was shot silent, and some was filmed in the Vitaphone sound-on-disc system.

Plot
Sonny Boy's parents are in the midst of a bitter divorce when the boy's mother talks her sister into kidnapping him because she is terrified that her husband will take the boy out of the country after the divorce. The nervy sister takes the lad to the apartment of her sister's husband's lawyer who believes that she has gone away for a time. A merry mix-up ensues when he returns to the apartment with his parents in tow. To maintain appearances, the sister must pose as the lawyer's wife. Eventually she decides to take the boy and flee, but then she realizes that Sonny Boy has vanished. It seems he saw an interesting theater marquee, climbed down the fire escape, and went to the movies. The adults arrive just in time to hear a rousing rendition of the hit song "Sonny Boy".

Cast
Davey Lee as Sonny Boy
Betty Bronson as Aunt Winigred Canfield
Edward Everett Horton as Crandall Thorpe
Gertrude Olmstead as Mary
John T. Murray as Hamilton
Tom Dugan as Mulcahy
Lucy Beaumont as Mother Thorpe
Edmund Breese as Thorpe
Jed Prouty as Phil
Richard Talmadge

Reception
According to Warner Bros records the film earned $838,000 domestically and $234,000 foreign.

Preservation status
According to silentera.com, a print of Sonny Boy exists.

References

External links

1929 films
1929 comedy films
American black-and-white films
Silent American comedy films
1920s English-language films
Films scored by Louis Silvers
Films directed by Archie Mayo
Transitional sound films
Warner Bros. films
1920s American films